Dolenje Kamenje (in older sources Dolenje Kamnje) is a small settlement in the hills north of Novo Mesto in southeastern Slovenia. The entire City Municipality of Novo Mesto lies in the traditional region of Lower Carniola and is now included in the Southeast Slovenia Statistical Region.

References

External links
Dolenje Kamenje on Geopedia

Populated places in the City Municipality of Novo Mesto